Re:(disc)overed is a cover album by American post-grunge band Puddle of Mudd. It was released on August 29, 2011 on Arms Division Records.

Background
The band began recording the album in March 2011 and commenced within a three-week period. After touring and rehearsals for a fifth studio effort left the band mentally and physically exhausted, the idea for a cover record came into play. The choice of songs was whittled down from 30 candidates and eventually led to the recording of 15 tracks.

Track listing

iTunes/European Edition bonus tracks

Personnel
Wesley Scantlin –  Lead Vocals, Rhythm Guitar
Paul Phillips –  Lead Guitar, Production
Doug Ardito –  Bass, Production
Jeff Bowders –  Drums
Duane Betts –  Guitar
Corey Britz –  Bass, Lap Steel guitar
Justin Durrigo –  Guitar
Bill Appleberry –  Piano, B3 Organ, all Organs

Guest vocalists
BC Jean, Gia Ciambotti and Kim Yarbrough

Production
Bill Appleberry –  Engineer, Producer, Mixing
Eric Colvin –  Engineer
Tim Hawkins –  Engineer
Navon Weisberg –  Assistant Engineer
Peter Doell –  Mastering
Jared Hirshland –  Pro-Tools, Conductor
Danny Wimmer –  A&R

References

External links
Official website
Puddle of Mudd at MySpace.com
Puddle of Mudd on Demand

2011 albums
Puddle of Mudd albums